The Qarabağ 2018–19 season is Qarabağ's 26th Azerbaijan Premier League season, of which they are defending champions, and will be their eleventh season under manager Gurban Gurbanov.

Season overview
On 17 January 2019, Qarabağ announced that Dzon Delarge had been sent to train with Qarabağ-2.

Transfers
On 2 June 2018, Rahil Mammadov and Filip Ozobić both signed a three-year contract with Qarabağ.
On 26 June, Qarabağ announced the signing of Abdellah Zoubir on a two-year contract from RC Lens.

On 4 July, Qarabağ announced the signing of Hannes Halldórsson on a two-year contract from Randers FC. The following day Simeon Slavchev joined Qarabağ on a three-year contract. Qarabağ announced the signing of Vagner on 6 July.

On 24 July, Dzon Delarge and Innocent Emeghara signed for Qarabağ.

On 19 December, Qarabağ announced the return of Reynaldo on a -year contract.

On 9 January, Qarabağ announced that they signed midfielder Hajiagha Hajili, who was on loan from Gabala, permanently on a four-year contract.

On 13 January, Joshgun Diniyev moved to Sabah FK.

Squad

Out on loan

Transfers

In

Out

Loans in

Released

Friendlies

Competitions

Azerbaijan Premier League

Results summary

Results

League table

Azerbaijan Cup

UEFA Champions League

Qualifying rounds

UEFA Europa League

Qualifying rounds

Group stage

Squad statistics

Appearances and goals

|-
|colspan="14"|Players away on loan:
|-
|colspan="14"|Players who left Qarabağ during the season:

|}

Goal scorers

Disciplinary record

References

External links 
 Official Website

Qarabağ FK seasons
Qarabağ
Azerbaijani football clubs 2018–19 season
Qarabağ